Wincrest Homes was established in 1986 in Parramatta, New South Wales, to build residential homes.

History 
Wincrest Homes started in 1986 mostly selling house and land packages.  The business evolved into a multi-disciplined business with contract building, speculative house building and land development activities.

In 2005, Wincrest Homes started a home building business in Melbourne, Australia.

In 2009, with the effects of the Global financial crisis, land was difficult to sell and the Melbourne side of the business proved to be unprofitable.  This combination of factors led to the directors making the decision to restructure the business to enable the Sydney contract building business to continue. All other activities outside of this were stopped.  This strategy was successful and today Wincrest Homes continues to build contract homes.

Projects 
The Hunterford Estate

The Hunterford estate, situated off Pennant Hills Road at Oatlands, New South Wales was a joint venture between Landcom and St Hillier's and involved 3 builders constructing approximately 150 dwellings to conform to strict design guidelines. With the assistance of Arcoessence Architects, Wincrest Homes designed and built a range of housing types including terraces with rear lane garage access, duplexes and triplexes, courtyard homes on 300m² lots with rear garage access, as well as split level designs on traditional manor lots. All homes were completed in the arts and crafts architectural style. The project won the 2003 Royal Australian Institute of Architects (RAIA) Premiers Award and the National UDIA award for marketing and the Premiers award in the 2003 Australian Institute of Architects NSW annual awards.

Honeysuckle Development

Linwood Village

This innovative development is situated in the precinct of Newcastle's harbour, which is being redeveloped by the Honeysuckle Development Corporation. A multi-builder approach was adopted by the developer with Wincrest Homes building a major proportion of the dwellings.

The development consisted of super lots of terraces with rear lane access to garages. Individual terrace lots varied in width from 4.5 metres to 6.5 metres. A total of 56 terraces in four stages have been completed.

Linwood Shores

Wincrest Homes were selected as the sole builder to complete the remainder of the project. Construction includes 49 Terrace dwellings with separate garages.

There are also 15 Mews Apartments constructed above some of the garages which are strata titled separate from the main dwelling. A total of 64 dwellings were erected for this portion of the project. Wincrest developed 120 dwellings in total at Linwood.

Awards 
Wincrest Homes has won building awards from the Housing Industry Association (HIA) and the Master Builders Australia (MBA).

References

Sources 
  Wincrest Homes website
 Homeworld Website

Companies based in Sydney
Construction and civil engineering companies established in 1986
Australian companies established in 1986